Three French ships of the French Navy have borne the name Jemmapes in honour of the Battle of Jemmapes:

Ships named Jemmapes 
 , a  74-gun ship of the line 
 , a 100-gun 
 , a coast guard ironclad launched in 1892 and struck 1922.

Notes, citations and references

Notes

Citations

References

French Navy ship names